Tau (Taw) is a rural locality (a village) in Lemezinsky Selsoviet, Iglinsky District, Bashkortostan, Russia. The population was 174 as of 2010. There are 2 streets.

Geography 
Tau is located 70 km east of Iglino (the district's administrative centre) by road. Ulu-Yelan is the nearest rural locality.

References 

Rural localities in Iglinsky District